Ian Dale Boylan (born May 6, 1983) is an American professional basketball player who last played for Kapfenberg Bulls. He spent most of his career in Austria, playing for several teams.

In August 2013, Boylan signed with Kapfenberg Bulls.

Honours
3x Austrian Bundesliga (2007, 2010, 2013)
Austrian Cup (2014)
Austrian Supercup (2014)
Individual:
ÖBL assists leader (2014)
Austrian Supercup MVP (2014)

References

External links
Profile – Eurobasket.com
Profile – FIBA.com

1983 births
Living people
American expatriate basketball people in Austria
American expatriate basketball people in Poland
American expatriate basketball people in Switzerland
Basketball players from Oklahoma
BBC Monthey players
BC Zepter Vienna players
Cal State Northridge Matadors men's basketball players
Kapfenberg Bulls players
KK Włocławek players
Österreichische Basketball Bundesliga players
Sportspeople from Norman, Oklahoma
Small forwards
Swans Gmunden players
American men's basketball players